Samuel Coxe  (1550–1612), of London; later of Fulbrook, Oxfordshire, was an English politician.

He was a Member (MP) of the Parliament of England for Rochester in 1572 and for Richmond, Yorkshire in 1586.

References

1550 births
1612 deaths
English MPs 1572–1583
People from West Oxfordshire District
English MPs 1586–1587
People from Rochester, Kent
People from Richmond, North Yorkshire